Loeseliastrum (calico) is a small genus of flowering plants in the phlox family.

Species include:
Loeseliastrum depressum - depressed ipomopsis 
Loeseliastrum matthewsii - desert calico
Loeseliastrum schottii - Schott's calico

References

External links
Jepson Manual Treatment

Polemoniaceae
Polemoniaceae genera